This article provides the names of the runners-up in the Miss World pageant since the pageant's first edition in 1951 and Continental Queens since Miss World 1981, the Continental Queens of Beauty were awarded for the first time.

Table of Miss World runner-up and finalists

From 1951 to 1952, 1957, 1959–1965, 1967–1978 and 1980 the pageant has awarded a Top 5 with the Miss World, 1st, 2nd, 3rd, and 4th runner-up being awarded. In 1954, 1966, 1981–2017 and 2019–present the pageant has awarded a Top 3 with the Miss World, 1st, and 2nd runner-up being awarded. On the other hand, the pageant has awarded a Top 6 in 1953, 1955, 1956 and 1958 with Miss World, 1st, 2nd, 3rd, 4th and 5th runner-up being awarded. Just in 1979 and 2018, top 7 and top 2 being awarded. Since 1959 top Each runner-up was given a tiara.

Since the pageant is based in 1951, the runner-up ranking for contest is usually announced as follows:
 1st-Place finisher being designated as Miss World 
 2nd-Place finisher being designated as 1st runner-up (or runner-up in 2018)
 3rd-Place finisher being designated as 2nd runner-up
 4th-Place finisher being designated as 3rd runner-up
 5th-Place finisher being designated as 4th runner-up
 6th-Place finisher being designated as 5th runner-up
 7th-Place finisher being designated as 6th runner-up

This table shows the runner-up of each competition, from its inception in 1951.

Countries/Territories by number of Runners-up

1st runner-up
The first runner-up of each edition of Miss World is the second placer behind the candidate who is crowned as Miss World (first placer).

This table lists the number of 1st runner-up titles by country. There are some special considerations:
 As South Africa and Guam took over the Miss World title in 1974 and 1980, it is unknown if the 1st runner-up position was taken by another candidate after the succession took place.
 Since 2000.  Competed as Miss England, Northern Ireland, Scotland and Wales, their results were inherited by Miss United Kingdom.

The current 1st runner-up is Shree Saini from United States, elected on 16 March 2022 in San Juan, Puerto Rico.

 The results of Miss Africa South were inherited by Miss South Africa.

2nd runner-up
The second runner-up of each edition of Miss World is the third placer behind the candidate who is crowned as Miss World (first placer), in Miss World 2018 the titles were not been given.

This table lists the number of 2nd runner-up titles by country. There are some special considerations:

 Since 2000.  Competed as Miss England, Northern Ireland, Scotland and Wales, their results were inherited by Miss United Kingdom.

The current 2nd runner-up is Olivia Yacé from Cote D'Ivoire, elected on 16 March 2022 in San Juan, Puerto Rico.

3rd runner-up

4th runner-up

5th runner-up

6th runner-up

See also
 List of Miss World titleholders
 List of Miss Earth elemental queens
 List of Miss International runners-up and finalists
 List of Miss Universe runners-up and finalists
 Big Four international beauty pageants

References

External links
 Miss World official website

Miss World
Miss World titleholders
Miss World titleholders